KUTV (channel 2) is a television station in Salt Lake City, Utah, United States, affiliated with CBS. It is owned by Sinclair Broadcast Group alongside independent station KJZZ-TV (channel 14) and St. George–licensed MyNetworkTV affiliate KMYU (channel 12, formerly solely a satellite station of KUTV from its 1999 sign-on to 2008). The stations share studios on South Main Street in downtown Salt Lake City, while KUTV's transmitter is located on Farnsworth Peak in the Oquirrh Mountains, southwest of Salt Lake City.

KUTV's programming is relayed on KMYU's second digital subchannel (VHF digital channel 12.2, also mapped to 2.1) in high definition to serve the southern portion of the Salt Lake City market not covered by the KUTV broadcast signal; the station also has a large network of broadcast translators that extend its over-the-air coverage throughout Utah as well as portions of Nevada and Wyoming.

History

Early history
The station first signed on the air on September 10, 1954, originally operating as an ABC affiliate. The original co-owners were Frank C. Carman & Associates and The Salt Lake Tribune, owned by the Kearns-Tribune Corporation. The station originally broadcast from studios located on Social Hall Avenue in downtown Salt Lake City. The deal was spearheaded by Tribune publisher John F. Fitzpatrick after his experience with two successful investments in local radio, including KSL radio (1160 AM) and KALL (910 AM, now KWDZ). In 1956, the Carman group sold its interest in the station to A.L. Glasman for the Ogden Standard-Examiner and his son-in-law and daughter, George and Gene Hatch. In the reorganization, the Kearns-Tribune Corporation retained a 35% ownership interest until 1970. In 1960, KUTV became the market's NBC affiliate, trading affiliations with KCPX-TV (channel 4, now KTVX), which joined ABC. In 1979, the station relocated its studio facilities to a new building located at 2185 South 3600 West in West Valley City.

In August 1994, NBC bought majority control (88%) of KUTV from VS&A Communications Partners (who had purchased majority control of the station in February 1993, leaving the Hatch's with a 12% stake), making it the second network owned-and-operated station in Utah (Fox had earlier purchased KSTU, channel 13, in 1990, and retained ownership of that station until 2008).

Switch to CBS
In November 1994, KUTV signed an affiliation deal with CBS as part of a complex deal resulting from Westinghouse Broadcasting (Group W)'s affiliation deal with the network which renewed CBS' affiliations with two Group W-owned stations and caused three other stations to switch to that network. CBS traded its longtime O&O in Philadelphia, WCAU-TV, to NBC in exchange for KCNC-TV in Denver, with KUTV added to the deal as compensation. NBC-owned WTVJ and CBS-owned WCIX (which became WFOR-TV upon the swap) also traded transmitter facilities in Miami as part of the deal. CBS then sold controlling interest in KUTV to Group W. NBC initially wanted to return to KTVX, but ultimately signed with KSL-TV (channel 5); the deal officially took effect on September 10, 1995. KUTV subsequently became a CBS owned-and-operated station when Group W's parent company, Westinghouse Electric Corporation, merged with CBS in late 1995. It is one of the few stations in the country to have been affiliated with all three heritage broadcast television networks, and one of a small number to have been an owned-and-operated station of two different networks. At the time, KUTV retained one NBC program: Saturday Night Live, which remained in its Saturday 10:30 p.m. timeslot for five more months after the switch, before it moved to KUWB (channel 30, now KUCW) in February 1996. Under CBS ownership, KUTV was one of five CBS-O&O stations that did not incorporate the CBS name into its branding, given the fact it was branded as "2News" as opposed to "CBS 2".

In 2003, the station moved from its longtime studio facilities in West Valley City to a street-side studio at 299 Main Street in downtown Salt Lake's Wells Fargo Center. The move was financed in part by the Salt Lake City Redevelopment Agency, in the form of $1.2 million in interest free loans. KUTV's newscasts overlook the street, and many segments take advantage of outdoor camera positions. The nearby Gallivan Center is also featured in some KUTV programs.

On February 7, 2007, CBS Corporation sold seven of its smaller-market O&O stations, including KUTV and KUSG (now KMYU), to private equity firm Cerberus Capital Management for $185 million. Cerberus then formed a new holding company for the stations, Four Points Media Group, which took over their operations under local marketing agreements in late June 2007. The Federal Communications Commission approved the sale in mid-November 2007, and the deal was finalized on January 10, 2008.

On November 26, 2007, KUTV began hubbing master control operations for its then-sister station, CW affiliate WLWC in Providence, which was also sold as part of the Four Points deal. On February 25, 2008, KUTV added three West Palm Beach, Florida stations (WTVX, WTCN-CA and WWHB-CA) to this operation. On March 20, 2009, Nexstar Broadcasting Group took over the management of all of the Four Points stations, including KUTV, under a three-year outsourcing agreement.

On September 8, 2011, Cerberus Capital Management announced the sale of the entire Four Points station group to the Sinclair Broadcast Group for $200 million. In October, Sinclair began managing the stations, including KUTV, under local marketing agreements following antitrust approval. The deal was completed on January 1, 2012. However, the Four Points station websites remained operated by Nexstar's interactive unit until early February 2012 when they were migrated to Sinclair's in-house digital interactive platform (Nexstar would subsequently purchase KTVX and KUCW from Newport Television in August 2012).

On May 8, 2017, Sinclair entered into an agreement to acquire Tribune Media—owner of Fox affiliate KSTU—for $3.9 billion, plus the assumption of $2.7 billion in debt held by Tribune, pending regulatory approval by the FCC and the U.S. Department of Justice's Antitrust Division. While KJZZ-TV and KMYU (despite the fact that the latter's city of license, St. George, is technically a sub-market within the statewide Salt Lake City market) are not in conflict with existing FCC in-market ownership rules and would be acquired by Sinclair in any event, the group is precluded from acquiring KSTU directly as broadcasters are not currently allowed to legally own more than two full-power television stations in a single market and both KUTV and KSTU rank among the four highest-rated stations in the Salt Lake City market in total day viewership (Sinclair CEO Christopher Ripley cited Salt Lake City as one of three markets, out of fourteen where ownership conflicts exist between the two groups, where the proposed acquisition would most likely result in divestitures). As such, the companies may be required to sell either KUTV or KSTU to another station group in order to comply with FCC ownership rules and alleviate potential antitrust issues preceding approval of the acquisition; however, a sale of either duopoly to an independent buyer is dependent on later decisions by the FCC regarding local ownership of broadcast television stations and future acts by Congress. Sinclair canceled plans to acquire Tribune Media in August 2018 due to a lack of FCC approval.

News operation
KUTV presently broadcasts 33 hours, 5 minutes of locally produced newscasts each week (with 6 hours, 37 minutes each weekday and two hours each on Saturdays and Sundays).

Following its sign-on, KUTV became the leading news station in Utah, in part owing to its roots with the Salt Lake Tribune. It lost the #1 position to KSL-TV in 1965 and spent most of the next 45 years as a solid, if usually distant, runner-up to channel 5. It began to decrease KSL-TV's ratings lead after CBS bought the station, culminating with its first-place finish in most timeslots during the November 2010 ratings period. For the February 2011 sweeps period, KUTV even unseated KSL-TV at 10 p.m., resulting in KUTV sweeping all of the news time periods for the first time in its history. May 2011 found KUTV dominating all newscast timeslots in total viewers. KUTV's run at the top was short-lived: In the November 2011 sweeps, KUTV slipped back to second place in most newscasts behind KSL-TV. However, for the February 2012 sweeps period, KUTV regained the lead in households in all newscast timeslots, except at 6 p.m.

From 2007 to 2009, KUTV produced a half-hour early evening newscast for sister station WTVX in West Palm Beach, Florida, titled CW West Palm News at 6:30. The program was anchored by members of KUTV's on-air staff and was broadcast from a separate studio; WTVX added material from two local reporters. On April 19, 2008, beginning with its 5:30 p.m. newscast, KUTV became the first television station in the Salt Lake City market to begin broadcasting its local newscasts in high definition. On June 7, 2009, the station abruptly canceled its weekend morning newscasts; this was followed the next day by the cancellation of the newscast that the station produced for WTVX; as with many newscast cuts at that time, it was likely due to the Great Recession, while WTVX's newscast was stunted by low ratings.

In August 2009, KUTV opted not to renew its lease for its news helicopter as a cost-saving measure, but continues to rent helicopters on an 'as needed' basis. The station also utilized "Chopper 2", a Harley-Davidson chopper motorcycle with a sidecar that is converted into a swiveling camera mount and seat for a camera operator for use in covering traffic accidents, weather reports, and parades. Weekend morning newscasts returned to the station in September 2012, while its weekday morning newscast was also expanded a half-hour early to 4:30 a.m. On September 9, 2014, KUTV moved the 4:00 p.m. newscast to 3:00 p.m., retaining the hour-long format and bringing Utah's even earlier newscast.

Notable former on-air staff

 Kathy Brock – anchor/reporter (1984–1990, later at WLS-TV in Chicago, now retired)
 Mark Eubank – meteorologist (later with KSL-TV; now retired)
 Christianne Klein – anchor/reporter (now with KLAS-TV in Las Vegas)
 Ric Romero – PM Magazine host (1982–1985, later at KABC-TV in Los Angeles, now retired)
 John Stehr – anchor (1982–1989; left for CNBC and CBS News; later primary anchor at WTHR in Indianapolis, now retired)

Technical information

Subchannels 
The station's digital signal is multiplexed. KMYU's simulcast of KUTV's schedule maps to 2:

On April 6, 2009, KUTV began carrying This TV on its second digital subchannel. On September 20, 2010, both KMYU and KUTV-DT2 added programming from MyNetworkTV, which brought over-the-air programming from that service back to Salt Lake City proper for the first time since KJZZ-TV (channel 14) became an independent station in 2008 (former MyNetworkTV affiliate KCSG (channel 14)'s over-the-air signal does not reach Salt Lake City, and thus that station has been carried only on cable). On January 1, 2015, KSL-TV took over as the Salt Lake City affiliate of This TV, and KMYU/KUTV-DT2 began to program traditional syndicated programming outside of MyNetworkTV hours.

Analog-to-digital conversion 
KUTV shut down its analog signal, over VHF channel 2, on June 12, 2009, as part of the federally mandated transition from analog to digital television. The station's digital signal remained on its pre-transition UHF channel 34, using PSIP to display KUTV's virtual channel as 2 on digital television receivers.

Translators 
KUTV is additionally rebroadcast over a network of low-power digital translator stations:

References

External links 
KUTV.com - KUTV official website
KMYU.tv - KMYU official website
 KUTV News Collection at University of Utah Digital Library, Marriott Library Special Collections

CBS network affiliates
UTV
Television channels and stations established in 1954
1954 establishments in Utah
Mass media in Salt Lake City
Sinclair Broadcast Group
Former General Electric subsidiaries
Former CBS Corporation subsidiaries